Bishop of Shrewsbury may refer to:
The Anglican Bishop of Shrewsbury (an area bishop in the Diocese of Lichfield)
The Roman Catholic Bishop of Shrewsbury (the ordinary of the Roman Catholic Diocese of Shrewsbury)